Autism therapies include a wide variety of therapies that help people with autism, or their families. Such methods of therapy also seek the increase of functional independence in autistic people. Many therapies marketed towards autistic people and/or their parents claim outcomes that have not been supported by Level of Research (LOE) Level 1 (highest level assigned based on the methodological quality of their design, validity, and applicability to patient care.) Level 1 research includes evidence from a systematic review or meta-analysis of all relevant RCTs (randomized controlled trial) or evidence-based clinical practice guidelines based on systematic reviews of RCTs or three or more RCTs of good quality that have similar results.

Autism is a neurotype characterized by sensory and communication difference, when compared to neurotypical and allistic individuals. None of these therapies eliminate autism within someone, let alone to a high degree of viability. Autistic children grow up to become autistic adults at risk of burnout and PTSD inflicted during childhood and adolescence, often overlooked by those who prioritize the elimination of autism over the common well-being of autistic people. Treatment is typically catered to the person's needs. Treatments fall into two major categories: educational interventions and medical management. Training and support are also given to families of those with ASD.

Studies of interventions have some methodological problems that prevent definitive conclusions about efficacy. Although many psychosocial interventions have some positive evidence, suggesting that some form of treatment is preferable to no treatment, the systematic reviews have reported that the quality of these studies has generally been poor, their clinical results are mostly tentative, and there is little evidence for the relative effectiveness of treatment options. Intensive, sustained special education programs and behavior therapy early in life can help children with ASD acquire self-care, social, and job skills, and often can improve functioning, and decrease symptom severity and maladaptive behaviors; Available approaches include applied behavior analysis (ABA), developmental models, structured teaching, speech and language therapy, social skills therapy, and occupational therapy. Occupational therapists work with autistic children by creating interventions that promote social interaction like sharing and cooperation. They also support the autistic child by helping them work through a dilemma as the OT imitates the child and waiting for a response from the child. Educational interventions have some effectiveness in children: intensive ABA treatment has demonstrated effectiveness in enhancing global functioning in preschool children, and is well established for improving intellectual performance of young children. Neuropsychological reports are often poorly communicated to educators, resulting in a gap between what a report recommends and what education is provided. The limited research on the effectiveness of adult residential programs shows mixed results.

Many medications are used to treat problems associated with ASD. More than half of U.S. children diagnosed with ASD are prescribed psychoactive drugs or anticonvulsants, with the most common drug classes being antidepressants, stimulants.  Aside from antipsychotics, there is scant reliable research about the effectiveness or safety of drug treatments for adolescents and adults with ASD. A person with ASD may respond atypically to medications, the medications can have adverse effects, and no known medication relieves autism's core symptoms of social and communication impairments.

As of 2008 the treatments prescribed to children with ASD were expensive; indirect costs are more so. For someone born in 2000, a U.S. study estimated an average discounted lifetime cost of $ ( dollars, inflation-adjusted from 2003 estimate), with about 10% medical care, 30% extra education and other care, and 60% lost economic productivity. A UK study estimated discounted lifetime costs at £ and £ for an autistic person with and without intellectual disability, respectively ( pounds, inflation-adjusted from 2005/06 estimate). Legal rights to treatment are complex, vary with location and age, and require advocacy by caregivers. Publicly supported programs are often inadequate or inappropriate for a given child, and unreimbursed out-of-pocket medical or therapy expenses are associated with likelihood of family financial problems; one 2008 U.S. study found a 14% average loss of annual income in families of children with ASD, and a related study found that ASD is associated with higher probability that child care problems will greatly affect parental employment. After childhood, key treatment issues include residential care, job training and placement, sexuality, social skills, and estate planning.

Educational interventions 

Educational interventions attempt to help children not only to learn academic subjects and gain traditional readiness skills, but also to improve functional communication and spontaneity, enhance social skills such as joint attention, develop cognitive skills such as symbolic play, reduce disruptive behavior, and generalize learned skills by applying them to new situations. Several program models have been developed, which in practice often overlap and share many features, including:
 early intervention that is not dependent upon a definitive diagnosis;
 intense intervention, at least 25 hours per week, 12 months per year;
 low student/teacher ratio;
 family involvement, including training of parents;
 interaction with neurotypical peers;
 social stories, ABA and other visually based training;
 structure that includes predictable routine and clear physical boundaries to lessen distraction; and
 ongoing measurement of a systematically planned intervention, resulting in adjustments as needed.

Several educational intervention methods are available, as discussed below. They can take place at home, at school, or at a center devoted to autism treatment; they can be implemented by parents, teachers, speech and language therapists, and occupational therapists. A 2007 study found that augmenting a center-based program with weekly home visits by a special education teacher improved cognitive development and behavior.

Studies of interventions have methodological flaws that prevent definitive conclusions about efficacy. Although many psychosocial interventions have some positive evidence, suggesting that some form of treatment is preferable to no treatment, the methodological quality of systematic reviews of these studies has generally been poor, their clinical results are mostly tentative, and there is little evidence for the relative effectiveness of treatment options. Concerns about outcome measures, such as their inconsistent use, most greatly affect how the results of scientific studies are interpreted. A 2009 Minnesota study found that parents follow behavioral treatment recommendations significantly less often than they follow medical recommendations, and that they adhere more often to reinforcement than to punishment recommendations. Intensive, sustained special education programs and behavior therapy early in life can help children acquire self-care, social, and job skills, and often improve functioning and decrease symptom severity and maladaptive behaviors; claims that intervention by around age three years is crucial are not substantiated.

National education policies

U.S. 
In the United States, there have been three major policies addressing special education in the United States. These policies were the Education for All Handicapped Children Act in 1975, the Individuals with Disabilities Education Act in 1997, and the No Child Left Behind in 2001. The development of those policies showed increased guidelines for special education and requirements; such as requiring states to fund special education, equality of opportunities, help with transitions after secondary schooling, requiring extra qualifications for special education teachers, and creating a more specific class setting for those with disabilities. The Individuals with Disabilities Education Act, specifically had a large impact on special education as public schools were then required to employ high qualified staff. In 2009, for one to be a Certified Autism Specialist the requirements included: a master's degree, two years of career experience working with the autism population, earn 14 continuing education hours in autism every two years, and register with the International Institute of Education.

Perceived disadvantages of autistic people in the U.S. in the 2010s 
Martha Nussbaum discusses how education is one of the fertile functions that is important for the development of a person and their ability to achieve a multitude of other capabilities within society. Autism causes many symptoms that interfere with a child's ability to receive a proper education such as deficits in imitation, observational learning, and receptive and expressive communication. As of 2014, of all disabilities affecting the population, autism ranked third lowest in acceptance into a postsecondary education institution. In a 2012 study funded by the National Institute of Health, Shattuck et al. found that only 35% of autistics are enrolled in a 2 or 4 year college within the first two years after leaving high school compared to 40% of children who have a learning disability. Due to the growing need for a college education to obtain a job, this statistic shows how autistics are at a disadvantage in gaining many of the capabilities that Nussbaum discusses and makes education more than just a type of therapy for those with autism. According to the 2012 study by Shattuck, only 55% of children with autism participated in any paid employment within the first two years after high school. Furthermore, those with autism that come from low income families tend to have lower success in postsecondary schooling.

Oftentimes, schools lacked the resources to create (what at the time was considered) an optimal classroom setting for those 'in need of special education'. In 2014 in the United States, it could cost between $6,595 to $10,421 extra to educate a child with autism. In the 2011–2012 school year, the average cost of education for a public school student was $12,401. In 2015, some cases, the extra cost required to educate a child with autism nearly doubled the average cost to educate the average public school student. As the range of those with autism can widely vary, it is very difficult to create an autism program that is well suited to the entire population of autistics as well as those with other disabilities. In the United States, in 2014 many school districts required schools to meet the needs of disabled students, regardless of the number of children with disabilities there are in the school. This combined with a shortage of licensed special education teachers has created a deficiency in the special education system. in 2011 the shortage caused some states to give temporary special education licenses to teachers with the caveat that they receive a license within a few years.

Mexico 
In 1993, Mexico passed an education law that called for the inclusion of those with disabilities. This law was very important for Mexico education, however, there have been issues in implementing it due to a lack of resources.

United Nations and internationally 
There have also been multiple international groups that have issued reports addressing issues in special education. The United Nations on "International Norms and Standards relating to Disability" in 1998. This report cites multiple conventions, statements, declarations, and other reports such as: The Universal Declaration of Human Rights, The Salamanca Statement, the Sundberg Declaration, the Copenhagen Declaration and Programme of Action, and many others. One main point that the report emphasizes is the necessity for education to be a human right. The report also states that the "quality of education should be equal to that of persons without disabilities." The other main points brought up by the report discuss integrated education, special education classes as supplementary, teacher training, and equality for vocational education. The United Nations also releases a report by the Special Rapporteur that has a focus on persons with disabilities. In 2015, a report titled "Report of the Special Rapporteur to the 52nd Session of the Commission for Social Development: Note by the Secretary-General on Monitoring of the implementation of the Standard Rules on the Equalization of Opportunities for Persons with Disabilities" was released. This report focused on looking at how the many countries involved, with a focus on Africa, have handled policy regarding persons with disabilities. In this discussion, the author also focuses on the importance of education for persons with disabilities as well as policies that could help improve the education system such as a move towards a more inclusive approach. The World Health Organization has also published a report addressing people with disabilities and within this there is a discussion on education in their "World Report on Disability" in 2011. Other organizations that have issued reports discussing the topic are UNESCO, UNICEF, and the World Bank.

Applied behavior analysis 

Applied behavior analysis (ABA) is the applied research field of the science of behavior analysis, and it underpins a wide range of techniques used to treat autism and many other behaviors and diagnoses, including those who are patients in rehab or in whom a behavior change is desired
. ABA-based interventions focus on teaching tasks one-on-one using the behaviorist principles of stimulus, response and reward, and on reliable measurement and objective evaluation of observed behavior. There is wide variation in the professional practice of behavior analysis and among the assessments and interventions used in school-based ABA programs.
Conversely, various major figures within the autism community have written biographies detailing the harm caused by the provision of ABA, including restraint, sometimes used with mild self stimulatory behaviors such as hand flapping, and verbal abuse. The Autistic Self Advocacy Network campaigns against the use of ABA in autism. – punishment procedures are very rarely used within the field today. These procedures were once used in the 70s and 80s however now there are ethical guidelines in place to prohibit the use.

Discrete trial training 

Many intensive behavioral interventions rely heavily on discrete trial teaching (DTT) methods, which use stimulus-response-reward techniques to teach foundational skills such as attention, compliance, and imitation. However, children have problems using DTT-taught skills in natural environments. These students are also taught with naturalistic teaching procedures to help generalize these skills. In functional assessment, a common technique, a teacher formulates a clear description of a problem behavior, identifies antecedents, consequences, and other environmental factors that influence and maintain the behavior, develops hypotheses about what occasions and maintains the behavior, and collects observations to support the hypotheses. A few more-comprehensive ABA programs use multiple assessment and intervention methods individually and dynamically.

ABA-based techniques have demonstrated effectiveness in several controlled studies: children have been shown to make sustained gains in academic performance, adaptive behavior, and language, with outcomes significantly better than control groups. A 2009 review of educational interventions for children, whose mean age was six years or less at intake, found that the higher-quality studies all assessed ABA, that ABA is well-established and no other educational treatment is considered probably efficacious, and that intensive ABA treatment, carried out by trained therapists, is demonstrated effective in enhancing global functioning in pre-school children. These gains maybe complicated by initial IQ. A 2008 evidence-based review of comprehensive treatment approaches found that ABA is well established for improving intellectual performance of young children with ASD. A 2009 comprehensive synthesis of early intensive behavioral intervention (EIBI), a form of ABA treatment, found that EIBI produces strong effects, suggesting that it can be effective for some children with autism; it also found that the large effects might be an artifact of comparison groups with treatments that have yet to be empirically validated, and that no comparisons between EIBI and other widely recognized treatment programs have been published. A 2009 systematic review came to the same principal conclusion that EIBI is effective for some but not all children, with wide variability in response to treatment; it also suggested that any gains are likely to be greatest in the first year of intervention. A 2009 meta-analysis concluded that EIBI has a large effect on full-scale intelligence and a moderate effect on adaptive behavior. However, a 2009 systematic review and meta-analysis found that applied behavior intervention (ABI), another name for EIBI, did not significantly improve outcomes compared with standard care of preschool children with ASD in the areas of cognitive outcome, expressive language, receptive language, and adaptive behavior.
Applied behavior analysis is cost effective for administrators 

Recently behavior analysts have built comprehensive models of child development (see Behavior analysis of child development) to generate models for prevention as well as treatment for autism.

Pivotal response training 

Pivotal response treatment (PRT) is a naturalistic intervention derived from ABA principles. Instead of individual behaviors, it targets pivotal areas of a child's development, such as motivation, responsivity to multiple cues, self-management, and social initiations; it aims for widespread improvements in areas that are not specifically targeted. The child determines activities and objects that will be used in a PRT exchange. Intended attempts at the target behavior are rewarded with a natural reinforcer: for example, if a child attempts a request for a stuffed animal, the child receives the animal, not a piece of candy or other unrelated reinforcer.

Communication interventions 

The inability to communicate, verbally or non-verbally, is a core deficit in autism. Children with autism are often engaged in repetitive activity or other behaviors because they cannot convey their intent any other way. They do not know how to communicate their ideas to caregivers or others. Helping a child with autism learn to communicate their needs and ideas is absolutely core to any intervention. Communication can either be verbal or non-verbal. Children with autism require intensive intervention to learn how to communicate their intent.

Communication interventions fall into two major categories. First, many autistic children do not speak, or have little speech, or have difficulties in effective use of language. Social skills have been shown to be effective in treating children with autism. Interventions that attempt to improve communication are commonly conducted by speech and language therapists, and work on joint attention, communicative intent, and alternative or augmentative and alternative communication (AAC) methods such as visual methods, for example visual schedules. AAC methods do not appear to impede speech and may result in modest gains. A 2006 study reported benefits both for joint attention intervention and for symbolic play intervention, and a 2007 study found that joint attention intervention is more likely than symbolic play intervention to cause children to engage later in shared interactions.

Second, social skills treatment attempts to increase social and communicative skills of autistic individuals, addressing a core deficit of autism. A wide range of intervention approaches is available, including modeling and reinforcement, adult and peer mediation strategies, peer tutoring, social games and stories, self-management, pivotal response therapy, video modeling, direct instruction, visual cuing, Circle of Friends and social-skills groups. A 2007 meta-analysis of 55 studies of school-based social skills intervention found that they were minimally effective for children and adolescents with ASD, and a 2007 review found that social skills training has minimal empirical support for children with Asperger syndrome or high-functioning autism.

SCERTS 
The SCERTS model is an educational model for working with children with autism spectrum disorder (ASD). It was designed to help families, educators and therapists work cooperatively together to maximize progress in supporting the child.

The acronym refers to the focus on:
 SC – social communication – the development of functional communication and emotional expression.
 ER – emotional regulation – the development of well-regulated emotions and ability to cope with stress.
 TS – transactional support – the implementation of supports to help families, educators and therapists respond to children's needs, adapt the environment and provide tools to enhance learning.

Relationship based, developmental models 
Relationship based models give importance to the relationships that help children reach and master early developmental milestones. These are often missed or not mastered in children with ASD. Examples of these early milestones are engagement and interest in the world, intimacy with a caregiver, intentionality of action.

Relationship Development Intervention 

Relationship development intervention is a family-based treatment program for children with autism spectrum disorder (ASD). This program is based on the belief that the development of dynamic intelligence (the ability to think flexibly, take different perspectives, cope with change and process information simultaneously) is key to improving the quality of life of children with autism.

Son-Rise 

Son-Rise is a home-based program that emphasizes on implementing a color- and sensory-free playroom. Before implementing the home-based program, an institute trains the parents how to accept their child without judgment through a series of dialogue sessions. Like Floortime, parents join their child's ritualistic behavior for relationship-building. To gain the child's "willing engagement", the facilitator continues to join them only this time through parallel play. Proponents claim that children will become non-autistic after parents accept them for who they are and engage them in play. The program was started by the parents of Raun Kaufman, who is claimed to have gone from being autistic to normal via the treatment in the early 1970s. A stated goal of the program is to increase eye contact. In a 2017 qualitative study it was found that autistic people have reported to find eye contact distressing. No independent study has tested the efficacy of the program, but a 2003 study found that involvement with the program led to more drawbacks than benefits for the involved families over time, and a 2006 study found that the program is not always implemented as it is typically described in the literature, which suggests it will be difficult to evaluate its efficacy.

TEACCH 

Treatment and Education of Autistic and Related Communication Handicapped Children (TEACCH), which has come to be called "structured teaching", emphasises structure by using organized physical environments, predictably sequenced activities, visual schedules and visually structured activities, and structured work/activity systems where each child can practice various tasks. Parents are taught to implement the treatment at home. A 1998 controlled trial found that children treated with a TEACCH-based home program improved significantly more than a control group. A 2013 meta-analysis compiling all the clinical trials of TEACCH indicated that it has small or no effects on perceptual, motor, verbal, cognitive, and motor functioning, communication skills, and activities of daily living. There were positive effects in social and maladaptive behavior, but these required further replication due to the methodological limitations of the pool of studies analysed.

Sensory integration 

Unusual responses to sensory stimuli are more common and prominent in children with autism, although there is not good evidence that sensory symptoms differentiate autism from other developmental disorders. Several therapies have been developed to treat sensory processing disorder (SPD). Some of these treatments (for example, sensorimotor handling) have a questionable rationale and have no empirical evidence. Other treatments have been studied, with small positive outcomes, but few conclusions can be drawn due to methodological problems with the studies. These treatments include prism lenses, physical exercise, auditory integration training, and sensory stimulation or inhibition techniques such as "deep pressure"—firm touch pressure applied either manually or via an apparatus such as a hug machine or a pressure garment. Weighted vests, a popular deep-pressure therapy, have only a limited amount of scientific research available, which on balance indicates that the therapy is ineffective. Although replicable treatments have been described and valid outcome measures are known, gaps exist in knowledge related to SPD and therapy. In a 2011 Cochrane review, no evidence was found to support the use of auditory integration training as an ASD treatment method. Because empirical support is limited, systematic evaluation is needed if these interventions are used.

The term multisensory integration in simple terms means the ability to use all of ones senses to accomplish a task. Occupational therapists sometimes prescribe sensory treatments for children with Autism however in general there has been little or no scientific evidence of effectiveness.

Animal-assisted therapy

Old model 
Animal-assisted therapy, where an animal such as a dog or a horse becomes a basic part of a person's treatment, was a controversial treatment for some symptoms. A 2007 meta-analysis found that animal-assisted therapy was associated with "a moderate improvement in autism spectrum symptoms". Reviews of published dolphin-assisted therapy (DAT) studies found important methodological flaws and concluded that there is no compelling scientific evidence that DAT is a legitimate therapy or that it affords any more than fleeting improvements in mood.

New model 
Modern animal-assisted therapy as relating to autism is not about 'controlling autistic symptoms' but about a natural way to bring about socializing (via bridging the Double Empathy gap) and also for stress reduction. As in a 2020 program: "the remarkable adherence to the therapy program by study participants and the program's clinically relevant effects indicate that AAT with dogs can be used to reduce perceived stress and symptoms of agoraphobia, and to improve social awareness and communication in adults with ASD with normal to high intelligence." In 2021, a study was conducted on this topic, specifically on "autonomic and endocrine activity in adults with autism spectrum disorder" in part for stress reduction, particularly as for autistic people the "downside of social camouflaging is that it is a major source of stress".

Neurofeedback 
Neurofeedback attempts to train individuals to regulate their brainwave patterns by letting them observe their brain activity more directly. In its most traditional form, the output of EEG electrodes is fed into a computer that controls a game-like audiovisual display. Neurofeedback has been evaluated 'with positive results for ASD', but studies have lacked random assignment to controls. This research is ongoing as of 2019 though now focused on "improving attention" and "reducing anxiety".

Patterning 
Patterning is a set of exercises that attempts to improve the organization of a child's neurologic impairments. It has been used for decades to treat children with several unrelated neurologic disorders, including autism. The method, taught at The Institutes for the Achievement of Human Potential, is based on oversimplified theories and is not supported by carefully designed research studies.

Other methods 
There are many simple methods such as priming, prompt delivery, picture schedules, peer tutoring, and cooperative learning, that have been proven to help autistic students to prepare for class and to understand the material better. Priming is done by allowing the students to see the assignment or material before they are shown in class. Prompt delivery consists of giving prompts to the autistic children in order to elicit a response to the academic material. Picture schedules are used to outline the progression of a class and are visual cues to allow autistic children to know when changes in the activity are coming up. This method has proven to be very useful in helping the students follow the activities. Peer tutoring and cooperative learning are ways in which an autistic student and a nondisabled student are paired together in the learning process. This has shown be very effective for "increasing both academic success and social interaction." There are more specific strategies that have been shown to improve an autistic's education, such as LEAP, Treatment and Education of Autistic and Related Communication Handicapped Children, and Non-Model-Specific Special Education Programs for preschoolers. LEAP is "an intensive 12-month program that focuses on providing a highly structured and safe environment that helps students to participate in and derive benefit from educational programming" and focuses on children from 5-21 who have a more severe case of autism. The goal of the program is to develop functional independence through academic instruction, vocational/translational curriculum, speech/language services, and other services personalized for each student. While LEAP, TEACCH, and Non-Model Specific Special Education Programs are all different strategies, there has been no evidence that one is more effective than the other.

Environmental enrichment 

Environmental enrichment is concerned with how the brain is affected by the stimulation of its information processing provided by its surroundings (including the opportunity to interact socially). Brains in richer, more-stimulating environments, have increased numbers of synapses, and the dendrite arbors upon which they reside are more complex. This effect happens particularly during neurodevelopment, but also to a lesser degree in adulthood. With extra synapses there is also increased synapse activity and so increased size and number of glial energy-support cells. Capillary vasculation also is greater to provide the neurons and glial cells with extra energy. The neuropil (neurons, glial cells, capillaries, combined) expands making the cortex thicker. There may also exist (at least in rodents) more neurons.

Research on nonhuman animals finds that more-stimulating environments could aid the treatment and recovery of a diverse variety of brain-related dysfunctions, including Alzheimer's disease and those connected to aging, whereas a lack of stimulation might impair cognitive development.

Research on humans suggests that lack of stimulation (deprivation—such as in old-style orphanages) delays and impairs cognitive development. Research also finds that higher levels of education (which is both cognitively stimulating in itself, and associates with people engaging in more challenging cognitive activities) results in greater resilience (cognitive reserve) to the effects of aging and dementia.

Massage therapy 

A review of massage therapy as a symptomatic treatment of autism found limited evidence of benefit. There were few high quality studies, and due to the risk of bias found in the studies analyzed, no firm conclusions about the efficacy of massage therapy could be drawn.

Music 

Music therapy uses the elements of music to let people express their feelings and communicate. A 2014 review (updated in 2022) found that music therapy may help in social interactions and communication.

Music therapy can involve various techniques depending on where the subject is sitting on the ASD scale. Somebody who may be considered as 'low-functioning' would require vastly different treatment to somebody on the ASD scale who is 'high-functioning'. Examples of these types of therapeutic techniques include:
 Free improvisation – No boundaries or skills required
 Structured improvisation – Some established parameters within the music
 Performing or recreating music – Reproducing a pre-composed piece of music or song with associated activities
 Composing music – Creating music that caters to the specific needs of that person using instruments or the voice
 Listening – Engaging in specific musical listening base exercises
Improvisational Music Therapy (IMT), is increasing in popularity as a therapeutic technique being applied to children with ASD. The process of IMT occurs when the client and therapist make up music, through the use of various instruments, song and movement. The specific needs of each child or client need to be taken into consideration. Some children with ASD find their different environments chaotic and confusing, therefore, IMT sessions require the presence of a certain routine and be predictable in nature, within their interactions and surroundings. Music can provide all of this, it can be very predictable, it is highly repetitious with its melodies and sounds, but easily varied with phrasing, rhythm and dynamics giving it a controlled flexibility. The allowance of parents or caregivers to sessions can put the child at ease and allow for activities to be incorporated into everyday life.

Sensory enrichment therapy 

In all interventions for autistic children, the main strategy is to aim towards the improvement on sensitivity in all senses. Autistic children often lack the ability to derive and sort out their senses as well as the feelings and moods of the people around them. Many children with autism also have this Sensory Processing Disorder. In sensory-based interventions, there have been signs of progress in children responding with an appropriate response when given a stimulus after being in sensory-based therapies for a period of time. However, at this time, there is no concrete evidence that these therapies are effective for children with Autism. Autism is a very complex disorder and differs from child to child. This makes the effectiveness of each type of therapy and even therapy activity vary.

The purpose of these differentiated interventions are to intervene at the neurological level of the brain in hopes to develop appropriate responses to the different sensations from one's body and also to outside stimuli in one's environment. Scientist have used music therapies, massage therapies, occupational therapies and more. With the Autistic Spectrum being so diverse and widespread, each case or scenario is different.

Mindfulness 
Emerging evidence for mindfulness-based interventions for improving mental health in adults with autism has support through a recent systematic review. This includes evidence for decreasing stress, anxiety, ruminating thoughts, anger, and aggression.

Parent-mediated interventions 

Parent-mediated interventions offer support and practical advice to parents of autistic children. A 2013 Cochrane Review found that there was no evidence of gains in most of the primary measures of the studies (e.g., the child's adaptive behaviour), however there was strong evidence for a positive pattern of change in parent-child interactions. There was some uncertain evidence of changes in the child's language and communication. A very small number of randomized and controlled studies suggest that parent training can lead to reduced maternal depression, improved maternal knowledge of autism and communication style, and improved child communicative behavior, but due to the design and number of studies available, definitive evidence of effectiveness is not available.

Early detection of ASD in children can often occur before a child reaches the age of three years old. Methods that target early behavior can influence the quality of life for a child with ASD. Parents can learn methods of interaction and behavior management to best assist their child's development. A 2013 Cochrance review concluded that there were some improvements when parent intervention was used.

Medical management 

Drugs, supplements, or diets are often used to alter physiology in an attempt to relieve common autistic symptoms such as seizures, sleep disturbances, irritability, and hyperactivity that can interfere with education or social adaptation or (more rarely) cause autistic individuals to harm themselves or others. There is plenty of anecdotal evidence to support medical treatment; many parents who try one or more therapies report some progress, and there are a few well-publicized reports of children who are able to return to mainstream education after treatment, with dramatic improvements in health and well-being. However, this evidence may be confounded by improvements seen in autistic children who grow up without treatment, by the difficulty of verifying reports of improvements, and by the lack of reporting of treatments' negative outcomes. Only a very few medical treatments are well supported by scientific evidence using controlled experiments.

Medication 
Many medications are used to treat problems associated with ASD. More than half of U.S. children diagnosed with ASD are prescribed psychoactive drugs or anticonvulsants, with the most common drug classes being antidepressants, stimulants, and antipsychotics. Only the antipsychotics have clearly demonstrated efficacy.

Between the 1950s and 1970s LSD was studied, however, has not been studied in this capacity since.

Research has focused on atypical antipsychotics, especially risperidone, which has the largest amount of evidence that consistently shows improvements in irritability, self-injury, aggression, and tantrums associated with ASD. Risperidone is approved by the Food and Drug Administration (FDA) for treating symptomatic irritability in autistic children and adolescents. In short-term trials (up to six months) most adverse events were mild to moderate, with weight gain, drowsiness, and high blood sugar requiring monitoring; long term efficacy and safety have not been fully determined. It is unclear whether risperidone improves autism's core social and communication deficits. The FDA's decision was based in part on a study of autistic children with severe and enduring problems of tantrums, aggression, and self-injury; risperidone is not recommended for autistic children with mild aggression and explosive behavior without an enduring pattern.

Other drugs are prescribed off-label in the U.S., which means they have not been approved for treating ASD. Large placebo-controlled studies of olanzapine and aripiprazole were underway in early 2008. Aripiprazole may be effective for treating autism in the short term, but is also associated with side effects, such as weight gain and sedation.

Some selective serotonin reuptake inhibitors (SSRIs) and dopamine blockers can reduce some maladaptive behaviors associated with ASD. Although SSRIs reduce levels of repetitive behavior in autistic adults, a 2009 multisite randomized controlled study found no benefit and some adverse effects in children from the SSRI citalopram, raising doubts whether SSRIs are effective for treating repetitive behavior in autistic children. A further study of related medical reviews determined that the prescription of SSRI antidepressants for treating autistic spectrum disorders in children lacked any evidence, and could not be recommended.

Reviews of evidence found that the psychostimulant methylphenidate may be efficacious against hyperactivity and possibly impulsivity associated with ASD, although the findings were limited by low quality evidence. There was no evidence that methylphenidate "has a negative impact on the core symptoms of ASD, or that it improves social interaction, stereotypical behaviours, or overall ASD." Of the many medications studied for treatment of aggressive and self-injurious behavior in children and adolescents with autism, only risperidone and methylphenidate demonstrate results that have been replicated.

A 1998 study of the hormone secretin reported improved symptoms and generated tremendous interest, but several controlled studies since have found no benefit. An experimental drug STX107 has stopped overproduction of metabotropic glutamate receptor 5 in rodents, and it has been hypothesized that this may help in about 5% of autism cases, but this hypothesis has not been tested in humans.

Oxytocin may play a role in autism and may be a possible treatment for repetitive and affiliative behaviors; Two related studies in adults found that oxytocin decreased repetitive behaviors and improved interpretation of emotions, but these preliminary results do not necessarily apply to children. Recent research suggests that oxytocin may decrease the noisiness of the brain's auditory system, increasing perception of social cues and the ability to react in social situations. However, the cues detected may not always be positive: increasing awareness of a trusted adult may be beneficial, but increasing awareness of an aggressor may increase distress. The possibility that oxytocin's effects are context-dependent means that its use as a treatment in autism-spectrum disorder should be carefully monitored.

Aside from antipsychotics, there is scant reliable research about the effectiveness or safety of drug treatments for adolescents and adults with ASD. Results of the handful of randomized controlled trials that have been performed suggest that risperidone, the SSRI fluvoxamine, and the typical antipsychotic haloperidol may be effective in reducing some behaviors, that haloperidol may be more effective than the tricyclic antidepressant clomipramine, and that the opioid antagonist naltrexone hydrochloride is not effective. In small studies, memantine has been shown to significantly improve language function and social behavior in children with autism. Research is underway on the effects of memantine in adults with autism spectrum disorders. A person with ASD may respond atypically to medications and the medications can have adverse side effects.

Prosthetics 
Unlike conventional neuromotor prostheses, neurocognitive prostheses would sense or modulate neural function in order to physically reconstitute cognitive processes such as executive function and language. No neurocognitive prostheses are currently available but the development of implantable neurocognitive brain-computer interfaces has been proposed to help treat conditions such as autism.

Affective computing devices, typically with image or voice recognition capabilities, have been proposed to help autistic individuals improve their social communication skills. These devices are still under development. Robots have also been proposed as educational aids for autistic children.

Transcranial magnetic stimulation 
Transcranial magnetic stimulation, which is a somewhat well established treatment for depression, has been proposed, and used, as a treatment for autism. A review published in 2013 found insufficient evidence to support its widespread use for autism spectrum disorders. A 2015 review found tentative but insufficient evidence to justify its use outside of clinical studies. New findings show TMS can positively affect gamma brainwave oscillations and help improve performance accuracy.

Alternative medicine 
Many alternative therapies and interventions used to be popular in the 1990s and early 2000s, ranging from elimination diets to chelation therapy, though few were supported by scientific studies. Treatment approaches lacked empirical support in quality-of-life contexts, and many programs focused on success measures that lack predictive validity and real-world relevance. Scientific evidence appeared to matter less to service providers than program marketing, training availability, and parent requests. Back then, it was presumed that even if they did not help, conservative treatments such as changes in diet were "expected to be harmless aside from their bother and cost" except that didn't take into account the mental health toll that attitude would have on the children in question who are now adults speaking out against such practices.

Acupuncture 
Acupuncture was studied and has not been found to be 'helpful in treating autism'.

Hyperbaric oxygen 

In 2007 further studies were needed in order for practitioners and families to make more conclusive and valid decisions concerning HBOT treatments. One small 2009 double-blind study of autistic children found that 40 hourly treatments of 24% oxygen at 1.3 atmospheres provided significant improvement in the children's behavior immediately after treatment sessions but this study has not been independently confirmed. This spawned a relatively large-scale controlled studies since to investigate HBOT. For example, in 2010 using treatments of 24% oxygen at 1.3 atmospheres, though it found less promising results. A 2010 double-blind study compared HBOT to a placebo treatment in children with autistic disorder. Both direct observational measures of behavioral symptoms and standardized psychological assessments were used to evaluate the treatment. No differences were found between the HBOT group and the placebo group on any of the outcome measures. A second 2011 single-subject design study also investigated the effects of 40 HBOT treatments of 24% oxygen at 1.3 atmospheres on directly observed behaviors using multiple baselines across 16 participants. Again, no consistent outcomes were observed across any group and further, no significant improvements were observed within any individual participant. Together, these studies suggest that HBOT at 24% oxygen at 1.3 atmospheric pressure does not result in a clinically significant improvement of the behavioral symptoms of autistic disorder. Nonetheless, news reports and related blogs indicated that HBOT was used for many cases of children with autism in the 2010s.

When considering the financial and time investments required in order to participate in this treatment and the inconsistency of the present findings, HBOT seems to be a riskier and thus, often less favorable. As of May 2011 HBOT could cost up to $150 per hour with individuals using anywhere from 40 to 120 hours as a part of their integrated treatment programs. In addition, purchasing (at $8,495–27,995) and renting ($1,395 per month) of the HBOT chambers is another option some families use.

As of 2017, "Hyperbaric oxygen therapy provides a higher concentration of oxygen delivered in a chamber or tube containing higher than sea level atmospheric pressure. Case series and randomized controlled trials show no evidence to support the benefit of HBOT for children with ASD. Only 1 randomized controlled trial reported effectiveness of this treatment, and those results have yet to be repeated."

Chiropractic 
Chiropractic is an alternative medical practice whose main hypothesis is that mechanical disorders of the spine affect general health via the nervous system, and whose main treatment is spinal manipulation. A significant portion of the profession rejects vaccination, as traditional chiropractic philosophy equates vaccines to poison. Most chiropractic writings on vaccination focus on its negative aspects, claiming that it is hazardous, ineffective, and unnecessary, and in some cases suggesting that vaccination causes autism or that chiropractors should be the primary contact for treatment of autism and other neurodevelopmental disorders. Chiropractic treatment has not been shown to be effective for medical conditions other than back pain, and there is insufficient scientific evidence to make conclusions about chiropractic care for autism.

Craniosacral therapy 
Craniosacral therapy is an alternative medical practice whose main hypothesis is that restrictions at cranial sutures of the skull affect rhythmic impulses conveyed via cerebrospinal fluid, and that gentle pressure on external areas can improve the flow and balance of the supply of this fluid to the brain, relieving symptoms of many conditions. There is no scientific support for major elements of the underlying model, there is little scientific evidence to support the therapy, and research methods that could conclusively evaluate the therapy's effectiveness have not been applied. No published studies are available on the use of this therapy for autism.

Chelation therapy 
Based on the speculation that heavy metal poisoning may trigger the symptoms of autism, particularly in small subsets of individuals who cannot excrete toxins effectively, some parents have turned to alternative medicine practitioners who provide detoxification treatments via chelation therapy. However, evidence to support this practice has been anecdotal and not rigorous. Strong epidemiological evidence refutes links between environmental triggers, in particular thiomersal-containing vaccines, and the onset of autistic symptoms. In 2002 Thiamine tetrahydrofurfuryl disulfide (TTFD) was hypothesized to act as a chelating agent in children with autism and a 2002 pilot study administered TTFD rectally to ten autism spectrum children, and seemed to find beneficial clinical effect. This study has not been replicated, and a 2006 review of thiamine by the same author did not mention thiamine's possible effect on autism. There is not sufficient evidence to support the use of thiamine (vitamin B1) to treat autism. Dubious invasive treatments are a much more serious matter: for example, in 2005, botched chelation therapy killed a five-year-old boy with autism.

No scientific data supports the claim that the mercury in the vaccine preservative thiomersal causes autism or its symptoms, and there is no scientific support for chelation therapy as a treatment for autism.

Diets and dietary supplements 

1990s hypotheses

In the early 1990s, it was hypothesized that autism could be caused or aggravated by opioid peptides like casomorphine that are metabolic products of gluten and casein. Based on that hypothesis, diets that eliminate foods containing either gluten or casein, or both, are widely promoted, and many testimonials can be found describing benefits in autism-related symptoms, notably social engagement and verbal skills. Studies supporting those claims had significant flaws, so those data were inadequate to guide treatment recommendations. Vitamin C decreased stereotyped behavior in a small 1993 study. The study had not been replicated as of 2005, and vitamin C had limited popularity as an autism treatment. High doses might cause kidney stones or gastrointestinal upset such as diarrhea.

2000-2014 hypotheses and research

In the early 2000s, many parents gave their children dietary supplements in an attempt to 'treat autism' or to 'alleviate its symptoms'. The range of supplements given was wide and few are supported by scientific data.

In 2005, it was thought that: although some children with autism also have gastrointestinal (GI) symptoms, there is a lack of published rigorous data to support the theory that autistic children have more or different GI symptoms than usual; studies report conflicting results, and the relationship between GI problems and ASD is unclear. Atypical eating behavior was thought to occur in about three-quarters of children with ASD, to the extent that it was formerly a diagnostic indicator. Selectivity is the most common problem, although eating rituals and food refusal also occur; at the time it did not appear to result in malnutrition in studies. Other elimination diets were also proposed, targeting salicylates, food dyes, yeast, and simple sugars. No scientific evidence has established the efficacy of such diets in 'treating autism' in children. An elimination diet may create nutritional deficiencies that harm overall health unless care is taken to assure proper nutrition.

In 2006 studies suggested that complementary and alternative medical (CAM) therapy use in children with chronic illnesses is higher than in children in the general population. In a study by Helen H L Wong and Ronald G Smith, they investigated patterns of CAM therapy use in children diagnosed with autism spectrum disorders (ASD, n = 50) as compared to a control population of children with no ASD (n = 50). Over half of the parents in the ASD group reported using, or had used at least one CAM therapy for their child (52%) as compared to 28% of the control group (P = 0.024). Seventy percent of therapies used in the ASD group were biologically based therapies consisting of special diets or supplements, and parents felt that 75% of the therapies used were beneficial.

For example, a 2008 study found that autistic boys on casein-free diets had significantly thinner bones than usual, presumably because the diets contribute to calcium and vitamin D deficiencies. A 2009 review found some low-quality evidence to support the use of vitamin B6 in combination with magnesium at high doses, but the evidence was equivocal and the review noted the possible danger of fatal hypermagnesemia. A 2005 Cochrane Review of the evidence for the use of B6 and magnesium found that "[d]ue to the small number of studies, the methodological quality of studies, and small sample sizes, no recommendation can be advanced regarding the use of B6-Mg as a treatment for autism."

Probiotics containing potentially beneficial bacteria were hypothesized to 'relieve some symptoms of autism' by minimizing yeast overgrowth in the colon. The hypothesized yeast overgrowth has not been confirmed by endoscopy, the mechanism connecting yeast overgrowth to autism is only hypothetical, and no clinical trials as of 2005 had been published in the peer-reviewed literature.

Dimethylglycine (DMG) was hypothesized to improve speech and 'reduce autistic behaviors', and was a commonly used supplement. Two double-blind, placebo-controlled studies found no statistically significant effect on 'autistic behaviors', and no peer-reviewed studies have addressed treatment with the related compound trimethylglycine.

Melatonin is sometimes used to manage sleep problems. Adverse effects were generally reported to be mild, including drowsiness, headache, dizziness, and nausea; however, an increase in seizure frequency was reported among susceptible children. Several small RCTs indicated that melatonin was effective in treating insomnia in autistic children, but further large studies are needed. A 2013 literature review found 20 studies that reported improvements in sleep parameters as a result of melatonin supplementation, and concluded that "the administration of exogenous melatonin for abnormal sleep parameters in ASD is evidence-based."

Although omega-3 fatty acids, which are polyunsaturated fatty acids (PUFA), were 'a popular treatment for children with ASD' in the 2000s and 2010s, there is very little high-quality scientific evidence supporting their effectiveness. Several other supplements were hypothesized 'to relieve autism symptoms', including BDTH2, carnosine, cholesterol, cyproheptadine, D-cycloserine, folic acid, glutathione, metallothionein promoters, other PUFA such as omega-6 fatty acids, tryptophan, tyrosine, thiamine (see Chelation therapy), vitamin B12, and zinc. These lack reliable scientific evidence of efficacy or safety in treatment of autism.

2015–Present research

It is now known that "children with ASD are at risk of having alimentary tract disorders – mainly, they are at a greater risk of general gastrointestinal (GI) concerns, constipation, diarrhea, and abdominal pain" and as succinctly summarized the Mayo Clinic website in 2019, "Yes, children with autism spectrum disorder (ASD) tend to have more medical issues, including gastrointestinal (GI) symptoms such as abdominal pain, constipation and diarrhea, compared with their peers." Presently, there is not 'a diet for autism' just advice to not ingest things the individual's body seems to reject, for example: gluten if the person happens to have Celiac disease. As of 2021, "there is no clinical evidence for applying specific (e.g., gluten-free or pro-biotic) diets" to the topic of autism.

Electroconvulsive therapy 
In 2009 studies indicated that 12–17% of adolescents and young adults with autism satisfy diagnostic criteria for catatonia, which is loss of or hyperactive motor activity. Electroconvulsive therapy (ECT) have been used to treat cases of catatonia and related conditions in people with autism but as of 2009 no controlled trials had been performed of ECT in autism, and there are serious ethical and legal obstacles to its use.

Stem cell therapy

2007-2012 
Mesenchymal stem cells and cord blood CD34+ cells have been proposed to treat autism in 2007 and as of 2012 it was thought they may represent a future treatment. Since immune system deregulation has been implicated in autism, mesenchymal stem cells show the greatest promise as treatment for the disorder. Changes in the innate and adaptive immune system have been observed- those with autism show an imbalance in CD3+, CD4+, and CD8+ T cells, as well as in NK cells. In addition, peripheral blood mononuclear cells (PBMCs) overproduce IL-1β. It was theorized that MSC mediated immune suppressive activity could restore this immune imbalance.

Other

Pseudoscience 
A number of naturopathic practitioners claim that CEASE therapy, a mixture of homeopathy, supplements and 'vaccine detoxing', can help people with autism however no robust evidence is available for this.

Packing 
In packing, children were wrapped tightly for up to an hour in wet sheets that have been refrigerated, with only their heads left free. The treatment was repeated several times a week, and could continue for years. It was intended as treatment for autistic children who harm themselves and mostly children who could not speak. Similar envelopment techniques had been used for centuries, such as to calm violent patients in Germany in the 19th century; it was re-popularized in France in the 1960s, based on psychoanalytic theories such as the theory of the refrigerator mother. As of 2007, packing was used in hundreds of French clinics. There was no scientific evidence for the effectiveness of packing in 2007, and there was some concern about risk of adverse health effects. As of 2019: "The main French associations of parents with autistic children succeeded in obtaining the prohibition of packing, announced by the French Secretary of State to the Ministry of Health in April 2016."

Religious abuse as treatment

Exorcism 
The Table Talk of Martin Luther contains the story of a twelve-year-old boy who some believe was 'severely autistic'. According to Luther's notetaker Mathesius, Luther thought the boy was a soulless mass of flesh possessed by the devil, and suggested that he be suffocated.

In 2003, an autistic boy in Wisconsin suffocated during an exorcism by an Evangelical minister in which he was wrapped in sheets.

Ultraorthodox Jewish parents in Israel sometimes used spiritual and mystical interventions such as prayers, blessings, recitations of religious text, amulets, changing the child's name, and exorcism.

Shaming / Other 
A 2009 study has suggested that spirituality of mothers with autistic spectrum disorders led to positive outcomes whereas religious activities of mothers were associated with negative outcomes for the child.

Historical outlooks

U.S., U.K., and France 
Children in Britain and America would often be put in institutions on the instruction of doctors and the parents told to forget about them, for example, "in Britain, until 1961, almost all doctors regarded these symptoms as part of some general "childhood psychosis" or junior version of schizophrenia". Observer journalist Christopher Stevens, father of an autistic child, reports how a British doctor told him that after a child was admitted to such an institution, usually "nature would take its course" and the child would die due to the prevalence of tuberculosis.

Anti-cure perspective and autism rights movement 

The exact cause of autism is unclear, yet some organizations advocate researching a cure. Many self-advocacy autism rights organizations such as Autistic Self Advocacy Network view autism as a different neurology rather than as a mental disorder, advocate acceptance, and are against ABA as it is seen as trying to force conformity to "neuronormative" society.

Criticisms of most educational, social, and behavioral focused autism therapies as put forth by autistic adults, teachers, and researchers frequently fall into the idea of these programs encouraging or even training behavioral responses directed toward "camouflaging", "passing as non-autistic", or "masking". Recent studies indicate that, among autistic people, burnout and mental health difficulties associated with masking  "driven by the stress of masking and living in an unaccommodating neurotypical world" is an issue (which also impacts autistic young people. and children) Animal-assisted therapy used to be directed toward symptoms of autism and some studies of the programs are now directed toward burnout.

In 2018 more studies began involving the experiences of autistic adults including their experiences with general practice medicine. Subsequent related studies have focused on communication preferences of autistic adults and the idea of "the 'Autistic Advantage', a strengths-based model".

See also 

Autism rights movement
Autism friendly
 Effects of equine assisted therapy on autism
 Ryan's Law
 Special education

References

Further reading 

 
  Reviewed in: 
 
 
 
  
 
 
 
 
  This describes a special issue of the journal Child and Adolescent Psychiatric Clinics of North America, titled "Treating Autism Spectrum Disorders" (volume 17, issue 4, pages 713–932) and dated October 2008.

External links 
 "Applied Behavior Analysis (ABA)" at Therapist Neurodiversity Collective. 

Treatment of autism